Petrus Antonius Laurentius Kartner (11 April 1935 – 8 November 2022) was a Dutch musician, singer-songwriter and record producer who performed under the stage name Vader Abraham (Father Abraham). He wrote around 1600 songs.

Early life and songwriting 
Kartner was born on 11 April 1935. He started his singing career at the age of eight, by winning a local festival. He lived with his family in Amsterdam and worked in a chocolate factory.

Kartner worked as a promoter and producer at record label Dureco with Annie de Reuver, with whom he formed Duo X. He was a member of the band Corry & de Rekels, which sold over one million records in the 1960s.

Kartner wrote the music for the opening and closing credits on the Japanese cartoon adaption of the 1990 TV series Moomin and "Ik ben verliefd (Shalalie)", the Dutch entry for the 2010 Eurovision Song Contest.

Father Abraham 

In 1971, Kartner created his well-known alter ego, Father Abraham, after writing a Dutch carnival song, "Father Abraham had seven sons". Initially he wore a fake beard, but subsequently grew a real beard which, along with a bowler hat, became his trademark. Also in 1971, his duet with Wilma Landkroon, "Zou het erg zijn, lieve opa" (Would it be bad, dear grandfather?), reached number one in the Dutch pop music charts.

In 1981 Kartner recorded a song about Weepuls, "Wij zijn de wuppies" (We are the Weepuls).

The Little Café by the Harbour, 1975 

In 1975, Kartner scored his second biggest hit, "Het kleine café aan de haven" (The little café by the harbour). This song has since been covered over 250 times in various languages.
English cover versions include "The Little Cafe by the Harbour" by Engelbert Humperdinck, "My Favourite Cafe on the Harbour" by Audrey Landers and "The Red Rose Café" by Demis Roussos and, separately, The Fureys. In French the song was recorded as "Le café de la Rue d'Amérique" by Mireille Mathieu and "Le café des trois Colombes" by Joe Dassin, and in German as "Die kleine Kneipe" by Peter Alexander. In Dutch it was rerecorded by André Rieu conducting the Maastricht Salon Orchestra.

The Smurfs, 1977–2005 

In May 1977, Kartner was asked to make a promotional song about The Smurfs. The record company initially only pressed 1,000 copies of the single, called "The Smurf Song", since they were unsure about the single's potential. However, they were all sold within one day at a Schlager festival. After a repress, 400,000 singles were quickly sold. A full Smurfs album was then created, which sold 500,000 copies. The album was released in several dozen countries, including France, Germany, Italy, Japan, Spain, and Sweden, and in various different languages. The album scored a number one hit in 16 countries. Subsequently, Kartner released other Smurf-themed albums, again in various countries and languages, such as Ga je mee naar Smurfenland (Dutch) and Vater Abraham im Land der Schlümpfe (German). In all, Kartner's Smurf works have sold around 17 million copies.

In 2005 Vader Abraham recorded The Smurf Song together with the dance act Dynamite.

Political songs, 1973–2016 

As a reaction to the 1973 oil crisis, Kartner and the right-wing politician Hendrik Koekoek recorded the duet "Den Uyl is in den olie" (Den Uyl is in the oil), blaming the social democratic prime minister Joop den Uyl and Arabs for the crisis. In the carnival season of 1975, he published "Wat doen we met die Arabieren hier" (What do we do with the Arabs here?), containing the lines "What shall we do with the Arabs here? They can't be trusted with our pretty women here." The record company has subsequently deleted the song. His 1976 song, "Het leger der werklozen" (The army of unemployed) portrays the jobless as people who spend the day sitting in pubs, drinking alcohol. 

In 2002 Kartner recorded "Wimmetje gaat, Pimmetje komt" (Wim goes, Pim comes) with rising politician Pim Fortuyn, predicting that Fortuyn may replace Wim Kok as prime-minister. Before this could happen, Fortuyn was assassinated. In 2012, he recorded "Beste Koning" (Dear King) and in 2016 "Ik wil mijn gulden terug" (I want the guilder back).

Honors and awards 
 Buma Export Award (1978)
 Buma Lifetime Achievement Award (2015)

Personal life and death 
Kartner lived in Breda with his wife Annie. They had a son, Walter.

Kartner died in Breda of bone cancer on 8 November 2022, at the age of 87.

Discography

Studio albums 
 Een lach en een traan, 1972
 Vader Abraham Show, 1972, with others
 Veel liefs van... Vader Abraham en zijn goede zonen, 1972, with "zijn goede zonen"
 Vader Abraham en zijn goede zonen, 1973, with "zijn goede zonen"
 Samen jong, samen oud, 1974
 Samen jong, samen oud Geven voor Leven, 1974
 Kerst show, 1974
 Mooi Griekenland, 1976
 Bedankt lieve ouders, 1976
 In Smurfenland, 1977, with the Smurfs
 En el país de Los Pitufos, 1977
 Au pays des Schtroumpfs, 1978
 Im Land der Schlümpfe, 1978
 In Smurfland, 1978
 Smurfenbier, 1978, with the Smurfs
 El Padre Abraham y sus Pitufos, 1979
 Smurfing Sing Song, 1979 
 Veo veo, 1980
 Hitparade der Schlümpfe, 1980 
 Kerstfeest, 1979
 Die glücklichen Jahre, 1979
 De beste jaren van zijn leven, 1981
 Jij en ik blijven bestaan, 1981
 De wonderlijke Wuppie wereld, 1981, with the Wuppies
 El Padre Abraham y los Wuppies, 1983
 El maravilloso mundo de los Wuppies, 1983
 Los Wuppies del Padre Abraham, 1983
 Vader Abraham und die Wuppies, 1985 
 Dierenmanieren, 1985
 Vader Abraham zingt over apen en andere mensen, 1987
 Als je wilt weten wie ik ben, 1987
 Vader Abraham 2, 1988
 Waarom huil je nou, 1988
 Together forever (Dutch), 1990, with the Smurfs
 Together forever (English), 1990
 Schlumpfenland Wunderland, 1990
 Die Lieder der Mumins, 1992
 Lach naar de wolken, 1994, as Pierre Kartner

Collections 
 De beste van Vader Abraham, 1976
 De beste van Vader Abraham, 1977
 Bedankt Vader Abraham, 1979 (live)
 14 Feestsuksessen, 1981
 15 Jaar Karnaval, 1985
 Vader ziet Abraham, 1985
 14 Beste, 1987
 De 20 best, 1988
 Het beste van Vader Abraham, 1990
 15 Successen, 1990
 Op de deksel van de jampot, 1990
 Totaal, 1993
 25 Jaar: Zijn 36 grootste successen, 1995
 30 jaar Vader Abraham, 2000
 Gefeliciteerd Vader Abraham! – 80 jaar, 2015

References

External links 

 Official home page 
 Official home page 
 
 

1935 births
2022 deaths
People from Overbetuwe
Dutch male singers
Dutch folk singers
Dutch singer-songwriters
Dutch songwriters
Dutch composers
Dutch record producers
The Smurfs music
Dureco artists